The Franklin J. Schaffner Achievement Award is an American film award established by the Directors Guild of America (DGA), given to an Associate Director or Stage Manager in recognition of their service to the industry and the Guild.

Named after the American director Franklin J. Schaffner, it was first awarded at the 43rd Directors Guild of America Awards in 1991.

Recipients

References

External links 

 DGA Awards History

American film awards
Directors Guild of America Awards